The year 1811 in architecture involved some significant events.

Buildings

 Argyll House, London, designed by William Wilkins is completed
 The House wing of the United States Capitol, designed by William Thornton and Benjamin Latrobe is completed.

Events
 March – The Commissioners' Plan of 1811 determines the grid plan of Manhattan.
 John Nash prepares his plan of the Regent Street and Regent's Park areas of London.

Awards
 Grand Prix de Rome, architecture: Jean-Louis Provost.

Births
 c. May – Thomas Larkins Walker, British architect (died 1860)
 July 13 – George Gilbert Scott, English architect (died 1878)

Deaths
 May 5 – Robert Mylne, British architect (born 1734)
 August 22 – Juan de Villanueva, Spanish architect (born 1739)

References 

Architecture
Years in architecture
19th-century architecture